Szamocin  is a town in Chodzież County, Greater Poland Voivodeship, Poland.

History

Szamoczino in the Piast-ruled Kingdom of Poland was first mentioned in a 1364 deed, although it surely existed earlier and was probably founded in the 12th century. It was a private village of Polish nobility, administratively located in the Kcynia County in the Kalisz Voivodeship in the Greater Poland Province of the Polish Crown. It received town privileges from the hands of King Augustus III of Poland in 1748.

In the First partition of Poland in 1772 the town was annexed by the Kingdom of Prussia, fell to the Napoleonic Duchy of Warsaw in 1807 and was restored to Prussia in 1815, whereafter it was governed within the Kreis Kolmar in Posen, part of the Grand Duchy of Posen. During the Industrial Revolution, the town evolved to a centre of the weaving industry. From 1871 it was part of Germany. After World War I, in 1918, Poland regained independence, and the Greater Poland Uprising broke out, which goal was to reintegrate the region with the reborn Polish state. On January 13, 1919, the town was captured by Polish insurgents led by Maksymilian Bartsch, but was lost to Germany on the same day. The insurgents made an unsuccessful attempt to recapture the town, however in accordance to the Treaty of Versailles it was still reintegrated with the newly established Second Polish Republic in 1921.

After the joint German-Soviet invasion of Poland, which started World War II, in September 1939, it was captured by Germany, and already on September 17, the Germans murdered two Polish boy scouts in the town. Inhabitants of Szamocin were also among 41 Poles murdered in the nearby village of Morzewo on November 7, 1939. On December 10–12, 1939, the Germans expelled hundreds of Polish and Jewish inhabitants from the town to the General Government. In 1943, the German administration renamed the town Fritzenstadt, to erase traces of Polish origin. After the German occupation ended in 1945, the original Polish name was restored.

Sports
The local football club is Sokół Szamocin. It competes in the lower leagues.

Notable people
 Ernst Toller (1893–1939), playwright
 Heinz Seelig (1909–1992), Israeli architect 
 Adam Szejnfeld (born 1958), politician; councillor and Mayor of Szamocin 1990–1998
 Bartosz Ślusarski (born 1981), footballer 
 Radosław Cierzniak (born 1983), footballer

Nearby municipalities
 Margonin
 Chodzież

International relations

Twin towns — Sister cities
Szamocin is twinned with:
  Grasberg, Germany

See also
 Standesamt Samotschin 
 Greater Poland Uprising (1918–1919)

References

External links
 https://web.archive.org/web/20080111035809/http://www.szamocin.umig.gov.pl/

Cities and towns in Greater Poland Voivodeship
Chodzież County
Shtetls